Amparo Garcia-Crow is an American writer, director and actress, based in Austin, Texas. Garcia-Crow identifies herself as an "inter-disciplinary artist who acts, directs, sings, writes plays, screenplays and songs" as well as a film artist, with a "strong focus...for the last few years...in storytelling and the development of solo work" as she currently directs performance artists and storytellers.

Career 
Amparo Garcia-Crow has been a Master Acting Teacher for MFA Acting Program at University of Texas in Austin, and is currently an Assistant Professor of Drama at Austin Community College. She is the founder and current host of THE LIVING ROOM: Storytime for Grownups in Austin, Texas. Garcia-Crow has developed as a playwright at South Coast Repertory Theatre and Mabou Mines, and has world premieres Off-Broadway, Actor's Theatre of Louisville, Latino Chicago, and at various Southwest theaters and universities.

Currently, Amparo Garcia-Crow is in residence with NYC's Mabou Mines as she is creating and developing a new musical, Strip. Garcia-Crow is also working on the screenplays, Appeal and Unknown Soldier: The New American Musical of Mexican Descent with i25 Productions in Los Angeles. Some of Garcia-Crow's recent self-written-and-produced plays include, Death Rattle, Loves and Fishes, and Territories.

THE LIVING ROOM: Storytime for Grownups 
The Living Room was initially conceived as a fundraiser for her monthly trips to New York City, as an artist-in-residence with Mabou Mines theater company. Garcia-Crow found inspiration for THE LIVING ROOM: Storytime for Grownups in her own experience working with the original show, In The West, which featured “monologues written and performed by the members” of the independent Big State Productions and ran for six years from 1985 to 1991. Starting in 2010, Garcia-Crow developed the “monthly storytelling series” THE LIVING ROOM: Storytime for Grownups. Garcia-Crow created this series as a “renaissance” of her own “artistic development...of the deep exploration...about the power of story at its most stripped down and most human interactive possibility,” with the heart of the production to be ”about brave living and the hero’s journey for living”. The performance consists of three men and three women, for a total of six storytellers, with Garcia-Crow performing her own piece last. THE LIVING ROOM: Storytime for Grownups regularly has an audience ranging from 280-300 members per show.

Works 

Garcia-Crow's collection of works titled “Between Misery and the Sun: The South Texas Plays” is published by No Passport Press.

The book is described as: "Four plays by US Chicana dramatist Amparo Garcia-Crow that chart the violent, beautiful, hard-bitten lives of characters in South Texas. Cross-cultural collisions abound in the spirited geographies of her incandescent prose for the stage. With preface by acclaimed dramatist Octavio Solis and introduction by scholar Jose Limon of the University of Texas-Austin, this quartet of plays is a vital addition to published works of Chicana literature."

Plays included in the book:
 Cocks Have Claws and Wings to Fly
 Under a Western Sky
 The Faraway Nearby
 Esmeralda Blue
Her musical play, "The Unknown Soldier" about the tragic life of Gus Garcia, a lawyer who worked on civil rights for Latinos is one of the few plays to depict the life of a lawyer. The play was one of two finalists representing the National Association of Latino Independent Producers in ABC and Walt Disney Studio's Talent Development Scholarship Grant Program.

Garcia-Crow's short film, Loaves and Fishes was made with cinematographer, Nancy Schiesari in 2001. The film tells the story of a single mother and a family's prejudice against Latino day laborers. Loaves and Fishes, which is about a half-hour long, was shown on the PBS series, "Territories."

Acclaim 
Garcia-Crow has had her works premiered at Los Angeles Latino International Film Festival, Cine las Americas, SXSW Film Festival, and on the television network, PBS. Amparo Garcia-Crow has received the Larry King Playwriting Award for her play, Cocks Have Claws and Wings to Fly, as well as the "Best Female Protagonist” award at the Mae West Festival: for her play, Blue: La Mujer Moderna.

Garica-Crow has also been part of the NEA/TCG Director's Fellowship and she was a James Michener Fellow.

Acting 

Garcia-Crow has performed at the Kennedy Center as well as regional theaters in the Southwest. Some of her more recent films have been "Love in the Sixties" (2014), where she had the roles of writer, director, producer, and actress. She also was an actress in the film, "Straight A's" (2013).

Along with having roles in independent films, commercials, and industrials, Garcia-Crow also had a reoccurring role as "Mrs. Hernandez" on the PBS children's show, Wishbone.

References

External links 

 Official site
 "The Unknown Soldier" (video)
 Interview

University of Texas at Austin people
American women writers
American writers of Mexican descent
Writers from Austin, Texas
Year of birth missing (living people)
Living people
Hispanic and Latino American dramatists and playwrights
21st-century American women